Parwalpur me jadeja(काला) ek ladka rehta hai. Wo din prati din kala hota ja rha hai. Woh 65 hai

References
 http://www.brandbharat.com/english/bihar/districts/nalanda/Nalanda_PARWALPUR.html

Villages in Nalanda district